Erongo is one of the 14 regions of Namibia. The capital is Swakopmund. It is named after Mount Erongo, a well-known landmark in Namibia and in this area. Erongo contains the municipalities of Walvis Bay, Swakopmund, Henties Bay and Omaruru, as well as the towns Arandis, Karibib and Usakos. All the main centres within this region are connected by paved roads.

The Erongo Region had a population of 150,809 in 2011. As of 2020, it had 119,784 registered voters.

In the west, Erongo has a shoreline on the Atlantic Ocean.  On land, it borders the following regions:
Kunene - north
Otjozondjupa - northeast
Khomas - southeast
Hardap - south

Economy and infrastructure

Various mining operations occur within this region at places such as Navachab and on a smaller scale at places surrounding Uis and the desert area. Karibib also has a marble industry. Walvis Bay, fully incorporated into the Erongo Region in 1994, is the principal home of Namibia's fishing industry. Walvis Bay also boasts the only deep sea port and is the second largest town in the country. Swakopmund and Langstrand are popular beach resorts; Arandis supports mining industry and Swakopmund boasts manufacturing.

This region, with its link to the coast of Namibia, is well developed. Facilities such as schools, hospitals and clinics, the supply of electricity and telecommunication services are, with a few exceptions, well established. Erongo has 66 schools with a total of 32,114 pupils.

Politics 
The region comprises seven electoral constituencies:
Arandis
Dâures (formerly Brandberg Constituency)
Karibib
Omaruru
Swakopmund
Walvis Bay Rural
Walvis Bay Urban

In the 2015 regional elections SWAPO obtained 65% of the total votes (2010: 67%) and won six of the seven constituencies with only Dâures, traditionally a United Democratic Front (UDF) stronghold, narrowly won by the opposition. In the 2020 regional election the Independent Patriots for Change (IPC), an opposition party formed in August 2020, was the strongest party. It obtained 36.8% of votes overall and won three constituencies, including Swakopmund and Walvis Bay Urban. SWAPO obtained 30.5% of all votes and also won three constituencies. Dâures was again narrowly won by the UDF.

The governors of Erongo are: 
Cleophas Mutjavikua (2015–2020)
Neville Andre Itope (2020–present)

Demographics
According to the Namibia 2001 Population and Housing Census, Erongo had a population of 107,663 (50,040 females and 57,616 males or 115 males for every 100 females) growing at an annual rate of 1.3%. The fertility rate was 3.2 children per woman. 80% lived in urban areas while 20% lived in rural areas, and with an area of 63,579 km2, the population density was 1.7 persons per km2. By age, 11% of the population was under 5 years old, 18% between 5–14 years, 64% between 15–59 years, and 6% 60 years and older. The population was divided into 27,496 households, with an average size of 3.8 persons. 35% of households had a female head of house, while 65% had a male. For those 15 years and older, 57% had never married, 24% married with certificate, 2% married traditionally, 10% married consensually, 2% were divorced or separated, and 3% were widowed.

The most commonly spoken languages at home were Oshiwambo (37% of households), Afrikaans (22%), and Damara/Nama (21%) and German. For those 15 years and older, the literacy rate was 92%. In terms of education, 89% of girls and 86% of boys between the ages of 6–15 were attending school, and of those older than 15, 79% had left school, 9% were currently at school, and 8% had never attended.

In 2001 the employment rate for the labor force (71% of those 15+) was 66% employed and 34% unemployed. For those 15+ years old and not in the labor force (24%), 35% were students, 34% homemakers, and 31% retired, too old, etc. According to the 2012 Namibia Labour Force Survey, unemployment in the Erongo Region stood at 25.5%. The two studies are methodologically not comparable.

Among households, 96% had safe water, 12% no toilet facility, 73% electricity for lighting, 89% access to radio, and 20% had wood or charcoal for cooking. In terms of household's main sources of income, 4% derived it from farming, 67% from wages and salaries, 8% cash remittances, 8% from business or non-farming, and 10% from pension.

For every 1000 live births there were 43 female infant deaths and 54 male. The life expectancy at birth was 59 years for females and 54 for males. Among children younger than 15, 3% had lost a mother, 5% a father, and 1% were orphaned by both parents. 4% of the entire population had a disability, of which 21% were deaf, 41% blind, 10% had a speech disability, 10% hand disability, 22% leg disability, and 4% mental disability.

See also
Skeleton Coast

External links

References

 
Regions of Namibia